The Fall of Foyers (Scottish Gaelic: Eas na Smùide, meaning the smoking falls) is a waterfall on the River Foyers, which feeds Loch Ness, in Highland, Scotland, United Kingdom. It is located on the lower portion of the River Foyers, and drops .

History 
The flow over the falls has been much reduced since 1895 when North British Aluminium Company built an aluminium smelting plant on the shore of Loch Ness which was powered by electricity generated by the river. Artist Mary Rose Hill Burton, who was active in the unsuccessful resistance against the smelting plant, made many drawings and paintings of the falls before the plant was built, to capture the landscape in nature before it was lost.

Aluminium was first recognised in the early 1800s, and processes for extracting it from Bauxite ore were developed during the nineteenth century. The most promising was the Heroult-Hall process, separately developed by P T L Heroult in France and C M Hall in America in 1886-1887, but it required large amounts of electricity. The rights to using the process in Britain were obtained by the British Aluminium Company, which was formed in 1894. To produce a ton of aluminium required around 24 MWh of power, and the idea of obtaining cheap hydro-electrity to produce it was suggested. This allowed them to create a hydro-electric scheme without needing to obtain Parliamentary approval, and to ignore public opposition to the effects it would have on local amenities. The River Foyers ran through a gorge to the almost vertical Lower Falls, which was a beauty spot, and was a stopping point for tourists using the MacBrayne pleasure steamers running along the Caledonian Canal from Fort William to Inverness.

Construction began in 1895. Loch Garth was modified by a concrete and masonry dam at its south-western end, together with an earth embankment. Water from the reservoir was conveyed along the original course of the River Foyers to the top of the Upper Falls of Foyers. The water drove five Girard turbines connected to Oerlikon direct current generators, which could produce a total of 3.75 MW. This was sufficient for the production of aluminium, and some 200 tons per year were produced from June 1896. It was a new product, and with production exceeding demand, the power was also used to produce calcium carbide, and experiments were carried out to manufacture ferro-silicon, carborundum, cerium, magnesium, and precious stones.

The plant at Foyers steadily improved in efficiency, as the Heroult-Hall process was refined, and by 1904, world demand for aluminium had increased sufficiently that production of calcium carbide ceased, and the plant only produced aluminium. The plant shut in 1967.

In 1975 the site became part of the Foyers Pumped Storage Power Station on the banks of Loch Ness. It uses Loch Mhòr as the upper reservoir and Loch Ness as the lower reservoir. The turbines are controlled remotely from a control centre in Perth, and when there is a sudden increase in demand for electricity, the plant can start generating 300 MW  within 30 seconds, using 200 tonnes of water per second. At periods of low demand, the turbines are run in reverse, taking power from the grid to pump water from Loch Ness back into Loch Mhòr, ready for the next period of high demand. In order to allow back pumping, water for the power station no longer uses the course of the river, but is fed through  of pipes and tunnels which run to the station from Loch Mhòr.

The falls influenced Robert Addams, a travelling lecturer in natural philosophy, to write a paper in 1834 about the motion aftereffect. He observed that after watching the waterfall for a while, nearby rocks appeared to move upwards.

References

MAE Waterfalls

Bibliography

Geography of Inverness
Waterfalls of Highland (council area)
Pumped-storage hydroelectric power stations in the United Kingdom
Loch Ness